The common skink (Oligosoma polychroma), also known as the northern grass skink,  is a species of skink native to New Zealand. Although historically classified as a subspecies of Oligosoma nigriplantare, it is likely to be given separate species status as data suggests it is a distinct species.

Distribution 
The common skink is widespread in New Zealand from Stewart Island to the middle of North Island.

Conservation status 
In 2012 the Department of Conservation classified the common skink as Not Threatened under the New Zealand Threat Classification System.

References

External links 

Image of the holotype specimen of the common skink held at Museum of New Zealand Te Papa Tongarewa

Oligosoma
Reptiles of New Zealand
Reptiles described in 1990
Taxa named by Geoff B. Patterson
Taxa named by Charles H. Daugherty